Pilot Company (or simply Pilot) is an American petroleum corporation headquartered in Knoxville, Tennessee. Pilot operates the Pilot Food Mart convenience stores in Tennessee. Along with Berkshire Hathaway and FJ Management, Pilot is joint-owner of Pilot Flying J, the largest truck stop chain in the United States.

History 
Pilot Company was founded by James Haslam Jr. in Weber City, Virginia when Haslam purchased an existing gasoline station and opened it on November 20, 1958.  By 1965, Pilot owned 12 stations, and was selling 5 million gallons of fuel yearly. Pilot built its first convenience store in 1976, and converted the rest of its locations into convenience stores.

In 1981, Pilot built its first travel center, and has focused on that aspect of its business ever since. 1988 saw Pilot begin its concentration on expanding its travel center network in a nationwide presence. Also in 1988, Pilot opened its first travel center with a fast food restaurant inside. On September 1, 2001, Pilot and Marathon Petroleum Company formed Pilot Travel Centers, LLC. On July 1, 2010, Pilot and Flying J's travel center chains merged to form Pilot Flying J. The two brands maintain their separate identities in the merged company.

Investigation of price gouging

On September 14, 2008, Florida Attorney General Bill McCollum issued subpoenas to Pilot for investigation of price gouging in the days following Hurricane Ike.

Sports sponsorship

NASCAR
In 1998, Pilot sponsored Gary Bradberry and Triad Motorsports in NASCAR. This venture was short lived, however, ending in 1999.

Pilot returned to NASCAR in 2011 with the help of Scott Wombold when it became the primary sponsor of Rusty Wallace Racing driver Michael Annett in the NASCAR Nationwide Series. As the deal came after the Flying J merger, both Pilot and Flying J are primary sponsors of the car.

In 2012, when Annett moved to the Nationwide team of Richard Petty Motorsports, Pilot Flying J followed him to his new team.

In 2014, Annett moved to the Sprint Cup Series, driving the No. 7 Chevrolet for Tommy Baldwin Racing, and again Pilot Flying J followed him, re-entering the Cup Series for the first time since 1998. The sponsorship followed Annett to the No. 46 Chevrolet for HScott Motorsports on the Sprint Cup Series in 2016 and to the No. 5 Chevrolet for JR Motorsports in the Xfinity Series in 2017.

Pittsburgh Steelers
In 2008, Pilot president James (Jimmy) Haslam III, son of founder James (Jim) Haslam II, purchased a 16% stake in the Pittsburgh Steelers as part of the team's ownership restructuring due to some heirs of the Rooney family retaining stakes in gambling enterprises such as horse tracks and race horse breeding stables, violating NFL rules. It was not known at the time if it would lead to a sponsorship deal between the two at Pittsburgh-area Pilot Travel Centers locations, or possibly a sponsorship deal with the NFL in general nationwide. The Rooney family retained control of the franchise itself.

Cleveland Browns
In August 2012, Pilot president Jimmy Haslam purchased a controlling interest in the Cleveland Browns from Randy Lerner for over $1 billion, pending approval of other NFL owners. Under NFL rules, he needed to sell his share in the Steelers before buying the Browns. Haslam has made plans with the Rooney family to sell his Steelers interest, and is expected to sell that stake by the time the Browns purchase is finalized in October 2012. Haslam sold the naming rights to FirstEnergy to become FirstEnergy Stadium.

Columbus Crew
In late 2018, reports emerged that Jimmy Haslam had purchased Major League Soccer club Columbus Crew from Anthony Precourt, who wanted to move the club to Austin, Texas. Haslam, along with his wife Dee and former team physician Pete Edwards, took over as owners on January 1, 2019, as a deal to purchase the club from Precourt was finalized.

The Crew won the MLS Cup 2020, giving Haslam his first major sports championship as an owner.

References

External links
Company Homepage

Gas stations in the United States
Privately held companies based in Tennessee
Companies based in Knoxville, Tennessee
American companies established in 1958
Retail companies established in 1958
Restaurants established in 1958
1958 establishments in Virginia
Convenience stores of the United States
Truck stop chains
Haslam family
Family-owned companies of the United States